Korean passport may refer to:
South Korean passport, issued by the Republic of Korea
North Korean passport, issued by the Democratic People's Republic of Korea
Korean Empire passport, issued by the former Korean Empire in the early 20th century

Passports by country